André Couteaux (1925 – 1985) was a French writer and a scenarist.

Biography 
He was married to Béatrice de Cambronne, the daughter of Claude de Cambronne, with whom he had a son, Stanislas Couteaux. He was born in Ankara. He is also the brother-in-law of Laurence de Cambronne and the father of politician Paul-Marie Couteaux. He lived in Damville for more than ten years.

Books
 Un monsieur de compagnie, 1961,
English translation: Couteaux, André. Gentleman in Waiting. Boston: Houghton Mifflin, 1963.  (in over 100 libraries)
Dutch translation: Couteaux, André, and G.L.A. Neijenhuis. Een heer van gezelschap. Baarn: De Boekerij, 1970. 
German translation Couteaux, André. Man muss nur zu leben wissen: Roman. Reinbek b. Hamburg: Rowohlt, 1971. 
 L'Enfant à femmes, 1966
English translation, Couteaux, André. My Father's Keeper. Boston: Houghton Mifflin, 1968.  (in over 140 libraries)
Dutch translation: Couteaux, André, and G.L.A. Neijenhuis. Vrouw gezocht voor vader en zoon. Briljant boeken. Amsterdam [etc.]: Boekerij, 1982.
German translation: Couteaux, André, and Elisabeth Stader. Frau für Vater und Sohn gesucht. [Hamburg]: Rowohlt, 1970.
Finnish translation: Couteaux, Andre, and Irmeli Sallamo. Miten isästä jälleen tuli onnellinen mies. Hki: Kirjayhtymä, 1970. 
Spanish translation: Couteaux, André. El niño mujeriego. Barcelona: Plaza & Janes, 1968.
 Un homme, aujourd'hui, 1969
 Don Juan est mort, 1972
 La Guibre, Paris: J. Dullis, 1974. 
  Le zigzagli. Julliard, 1973.

Scenarii
 1964 : Un monsieur de compagnie by Philippe de Broca
 1969 : Mon oncle Benjamin by Édouard Molinaro

External links
 
 Bibliopoche

1925 births
1985 deaths
People from Ankara
French male writers
20th-century French male writers